The Westland Lynx is a British multi-purpose twin-engined military helicopter designed and built by Westland Helicopters at its factory in Yeovil. Originally intended as a utility craft for both civil and naval usage, military interest led to the development of both battlefield and naval variants. The Lynx went into operational usage in 1977 and was later adopted by the armed forces of over a dozen nations, primarily serving in the battlefield utility, anti-armour, search and rescue and anti-submarine warfare roles.

The Lynx is a fully aerobatic helicopter with the ability to perform loops and rolls.

Several land and naval variants of the Lynx have been produced along with some major derivatives. The Westland 30 was produced as a civil utility helicopter; it was not a commercial success and only a small number were built during the 1980s. In the 21st century, a modernised variant of the Lynx was designed as a multi-role combat helicopter, designated as the AgustaWestland AW159 Wildcat; the Wildcat is intended to replace existing Lynx helicopters.

Development

Origins
The initial design, then known as the Westland WG.13, was started in the mid-1960s as a replacement for the Westland Scout and Wasp, and a more advanced alternative to the UH-1 Iroquois. The design was to be powered by a pair of Bristol Siddeley BS.360 turboshaft engines. As part of the Anglo-French helicopter agreement signed in February 1967, French company Sud Aviation (later Aérospatiale) had a 30 per cent share of production work, Westland performing the remainder. It was intended that France would procure the Lynx for its Navy and a heavily modified armed reconnaissance variant for the French Army, with the United Kingdom in return buying Aérospatiale Gazelle and Puma for its armed forces. In October 1969, the French Army cancelled its requirement for the Lynx, so development of the armed variant was terminated at an early stage.

The first Lynx prototype took its maiden flight on 21 March 1971. In 1986, the former company demonstrator Lynx, registered G-LYNX, was specially modified with Gem 60 engines and British Experimental Rotor Programme (BERP) rotor blades. On 11 August 1986 the helicopter was piloted by Trevor Egginton when it set an absolute speed record for helicopters over a 15 and 25 km course by reaching ; an official record with the FAI it still holds. At this speed, its lift-to-drag ratio was 2, and its BERP blade tips reached a speed of Mach 0.97.

The British Army ordered over 100 Lynx helicopters under the designation of Lynx AH.1 (Army Helicopter Mark 1) to perform several roles, such as transport, armed escort, anti-tank warfare (with eight TOW missiles), reconnaissance and evacuation missions. Deliveries of production helicopters began in 1977. An improved Lynx AH.1 with Gem 41-1 or Gem 42 engines and an uprated transmission was referred to as the Lynx AH.5; only five were built for evaluation. The AH.5 led to the Lynx AH.7, which added a new tail rotor derived from the Westland 30, a reinforced airframe, improved avionics and defensive aids.

The initial naval variant of the Lynx, known as the Lynx HAS.2 in British service, or Lynx Mk.2(FN) in French service, differed from the Lynx AH.1 in being equipped with a tricycle undercarriage and a deck restraint system, folding main rotor blades, an emergency flotation system and a nose-mounted radar. An improved Lynx for the Royal Navy, the Lynx HAS.3, had Gem 42-1 Mark 204 engines, an uprated transmission, a new flotation system and an Orange Crop ESM system. The Lynx HAS.3 also received various other updates in service. A similar upgrade to the French Lynx was known as the Lynx Mk.4(FN).

Licensed manufacturing, Super Lynx, and Battlefield Lynx

In September 1974, the British and Egyptian governments initiated talks to establish a new Egyptian helicopter manufacturer. Out of these talks, the Arab British Helicopter Company (ABHCO) was established during the 1970s; this new organisation was accompanied by an initial arrangement to manufacture under licence the Lynx AH.1 in Helwan, Egypt. A separate agreement was formalised with Rolls-Royce to license manufacture the Lynx's Gem engines at the Helwan facility. However, this plan was ultimately aborted due to a lack of funds that resulted from the collapse of the Arab Organization for Industrialization (AOI).

Announced in 1984, the Lynx-3 was an enhanced development, featuring a stretched fuselage, a redesigned tail boom, Gem 60-3/1 engines, a wheeled tricycle undercarriage, BERP rotor blades, and increased fuel capacity. Both Army and Naval variants were proposed; however, the project was ended in 1987 due to insufficient orders being placed. Only one Army Lynx-3 prototype was built. A development of the Lynx AH.7 with the wheeled undercarriage of the Lynx-3 was marketed by Westland as the Battlefield Lynx in the late 1980s. The prototype first flew in November 1989, and deliveries began in 1991. In British Army service this variant is designated as the Lynx AH.9.

In the early 1990s, Westland incorporated some of the technology from the Naval Lynx-3 design into a less-radical Super Lynx. This featured BERP rotor blades, the Westland 30-derived tail rotor, Gem 42 engines, a new under-nose 360-degree radar installation and an optional nose-mounted electro-optical sensor turret. Royal Navy Lynx HAS.3s upgraded to Super Lynx standard were known in service as the Lynx HMA.8, and several export customers ordered new-build or upgraded Super Lynxes. From the 1990s onwards, Westland began offering the Super Lynx 200, which was equipped with LHTEC CTS800 engines, and the Super Lynx 300, which also had a new cockpit and avionics derived from the AgustaWestland EH101. Both of these models have achieved several export sales. In 2002, Flight International reported that more than 40 variants of the Lynx were in service with different users, almost 400 aircraft having been built for various customers.

Future Lynx/Lynx Wildcat

The British Army and Royal Navy Lynx fleets were to be replaced to a new common advanced Lynx variant based on the Super Lynx 300, with a new tail boom, undercarriage, cockpit, avionics and sensors. Initially referred to as the Future Lynx, and later as the Lynx Wildcat, this type has since been re-designated as the AW159 Wildcat.

While having the Lynx as the origins and basis of its design, the Wildcat differs substantially.  Only 5% of its components, including some main rotor gearbox parts and fuel system, remain interchangeable with previous Lynx variants.

Design

The Lynx is a multi-purpose twin-engine battlefield helicopter, of which specialised versions have been developed for both sea and land-based warfare. A distinguishing feature between early and later aircraft is the undercarriage: early Army versions of the Lynx were equipped with skids, while the Naval and later models have been outfitted with wheels, a requirement for easy ground handling on the deck of a warship. Early versions of the Lynx were powered by a pair of Rolls-Royce Gem turboshaft engines and had a four-blade rotor, mounted on a rigid titanium monobloc rotor head of the kind pioneered by the MBB BO105 a few years earlier. The innovative blade design comprised a honeycomb sandwich structure made out of composite material. For shipboard stowage, both the rotor blades and tail can be folded. Lag dampers were incorporated but these are not required in flight (owing to the rigidity of the monobloc rotor head). In flight, the main rotor is kept at a constant speed, simplifying aircraft control; the rotor also features a vibration absorption system.

The Lynx is an agile helicopter, capable of performing loops and rolls, and of attaining high speeds. The agility of the type led to its use as an aerial display aircraft, having been operated by the Blue Eagles and Black Cats helicopter display teams. The efficiency of the main rotor, as well as the overall top speed of the Lynx, was substantially improved with the adoption of BERP rotor blade technology. During the 1990s, the hot-and-high performance of the type was considerably boosted in the later Super Lynx 200 series, at which point the type's Gem engines were replaced with the newer LHTEC T800 turboshaft engine with associated FADEC system; the Lynx can also maintain a good level of performance under moderate icing conditions. The FADEC controls eliminated the requirement for a throttle or manual speed selection switches, further simplifying flight control. Later aircraft feature automatic stabilisation equipment; functions such as auto-hover are installed on some Lynx.

Various avionics and on-board systems are integrated on the Lynx in order to perform differing mission profiles. Several operators have equipped their Lynx with BAE Systems' Seaspray surveillance radar to provide for a surface search capability, which is used in maritime patrol, search and rescue, and other mission profiles. British Army models are equipped with a Marconi Elliot automatic flight control system capable of performing automatic three axes stabilisation. The integration of both avionics and weapons systems is customised for each Lynx batch to customer specifications and requirements. Most of the installed sensors and avionics are typically integrated with the aircraft's avionics management system (AMS), from where they can be managed by either pilot; sensors such the optional nose-mounted FLIR can be set up to directly cue the weapon systems. Functions such as navigation and communications are also tied into the AMS, with information from these systems displayed to the pilots on interchangeable integrated display units in the cockpit. The Lynx is considerably easier to service and maintain than the AgustaWestland Apache.

The Lynx features a two-man cockpit for a pilot and observer sitting side by side; the British Army typically operates their fleet with a three-man crew, a door gunner being the third member. The cabin, located behind the cockpit, is accessed through a pair of large sliding doors on each side of the fuselage; it can accommodate up to ten equipped troops, depending upon seating configuration. An alternative configuration houses radio equipment in the cabin area when the aircraft is being used in the airborne command post role; the cabin can also be used to house additional fuel tanks for conducting long distance missions and ferry trips. The Lynx can perform a wide variety of mission types, including anti-submarine and anti-surface warfare, vessel replenishment, search and rescue, airborne reconnaissance, armed attack, casualty evacuation and troop transport; according to AgustaWestland, a Lynx can be converted from one mission-type to another within the space of 40 minutes.

Typical combat equipment includes stabilised roof-mounted sensors, onboard countermeasures and door guns; when being used in the anti-tank role, the Lynx is typically armed with BGM-71 TOW missiles; missiles such as the Sea Skua have been used in the maritime anti-surface role. Additional armaments that have been interchangeably used include rockets, 20 mm cannons, torpedoes, and depth charges. Those Lynx built for export have been typically outfitted with armaments and equipment customised for the end-user, such as the Mokopa air-to-surface missile used on Algeria's Lynx fleet, eight of which can be carried; studies into equipping the AGM-114 Hellfire have been performed, and air-to-air missiles could also reportedly be adopted if the capability is sought by operators. Equipped armaments can be managed and controlled inflight through the onboard stores management system. In order to counteract battlefield threats such as infrared-guided missiles, various defensive aid subsystems can be optionally installed, including warning receivers and countermeasures.

Many of the Lynx's components had been derived from earlier Westland helicopters such as the Scout and Wasp. The Lynx has been substantially upgraded since entering service in the 1970s; improvements made to in-service aircraft have typically included strengthened airframes, new avionics and engines, improved rotor blades, and additional surveillance and communications systems. Various subsystems from overseas suppliers have been incorporated into some Lynx variants; during a South Korean procurement, hulls produced in the United Kingdom were equipped with Korean-built systems, such as ISTAR, electro-optical, electronic warfare, fire-control systems, flight control actuators, and undercarriages. A glass cockpit was adopted on the Super Lynx 300, featuring fully integrated flight and mission display systems, a variety of integrated display units including head-up displays, and dual controls; AgustaWestland has commented that the new cockpit reduces aircrew workload and increases aircraft effectiveness. The head-up display installed could be replaced by a helmet-mounted sight system on customer demand.

Operational history

United Kingdom
The Lynx AH.1 entered service with the British Army's Army Air Corps (AAC) in 1979, followed by the Lynx HAS.2 with the Fleet Air Arm (FAA) in 1981. The FAA fleet was upgraded to Lynx HAS.3 standard during the 1980s, and again to HMA.8 standard in the 1990s. Most Army aircraft were upgraded to Lynx AH.7 and the later AH.9/AH.9A standards as utility helicopters; they have also served with 3 Commando Brigade Air Squadron (3 CBAS) of the Royal Marines and later, the Commando Helicopter Force (CHF) of the FAA, operating as reconnaissance and attack/utility helicopters to support the Royal Marines. During the Cold War, it was envisioned that Army Lynxes would be paired with Westland Gazelle helicopters to counter Soviet armoured vehicles. Lynx HAS.3 and HMA.8 variants operate as anti-submarine warfare and maritime attack helicopters armed with Sting Ray torpedoes, Sea Skua anti-ship missiles and depth charges, from Royal Navy warships. Navy Lynx have been critical to maritime patrol operations, including non-military operations such as counter-narcotics missions.

The Lynx HAS.2 ASW variant participated in combat operations during the Falklands War in 1982. A combination of Lynx and Westland Sea King helicopters were used to maintain continuous anti-submarine patrols in order to protect the British task force offshore from the Falkland Islands. On 3 May, a Lynx conducted the first combat-firing of a Sea Skua missile, firing on the Argentinian patrol boat ARA Alférez Sobral, inflicting considerable damage to the vessel. This was the first use of sea-skimming missiles in the conflict. Although none were shot down in combat, a total of three were lost aboard vessels that were struck by attacks from Argentine aircraft, these vessels being ,  and SS Atlantic Conveyor.

A door had detached when opened inflight and collided with the tail rotor, resulting in the aircraft splitting in half and the death of all nine personnel on board. As a result, door modifications and inflight opening restrictions were introduced. As of 2004, it remained the deadliest Lynx crash.

The Navy's Lynx helicopters were among Britain's contribution to the coalition against Saddam Hussein's Iraq during the 1991 Gulf War. During the Battle of Bubiyan, the biggest naval engagement of the conflict, the Lynx and its Sea Skua missiles proved to be decisive, being responsible for the majority of individual engagements with various Iraqi Navy vessels. By 2 February 1991, 25 Sea Skuas had been launched, out of these, 18 were confirmed as having hit their targets, and had succeeding in heavily damaging a significant portion of Iraq's navy. Navy Lynxes were routinely used to deploy troops to oil platforms and into occupied Kuwait, as well as to perform aerial reconnaissance across the Gulf.

The British Army also deployed 24 TOW-armed Lynxes alongside an equal number of Westland Gazelle helicopters during the Gulf War. They were assigned the mission of locating and attacking Iraqi tank concentrations, and to support the advance of coalition ground forces into Kuwait and Southern Iraq during the 100 hours war phase of the conflict. On 26 February 1991, a Lynx of 654 Squadron AAC destroyed two MTLB armoured personnel carriers (APCs) and four T-55 tanks using TOW missiles: the engagement was the first recorded use of the missile from a British helicopter.

On 19 March 1994, during The Troubles in Northern Ireland, the Irish Republican Army (IRA) brought down Lynx AH.7 ZD275 of the AAC with an improvised mortar, striking it while attempting to land at Crossmaglen Army base. The pilot managed to crash land and the aircraft was destroyed, but all crew on board survived. Author Toby Harnden described the incident as the IRA's most successful operation against a helicopter.

Various British Lynxes were used during the NATO intervention in the conflict between Serbia and Kosovo, later known as the Kosovo War. They were frequently employed to supply NATO forces inside the theatre, including those engaged in humanitarian operations. In June 1999, the type was employed to escort British ground forces being air-deployed into Kosovo via Chinooks, during NATO's first phase of deployment. For a number of years, British Army Lynx and Gazelle helicopters were deployed within Kosovo, performing reconnaissance and transport duties in support of NATO peacekeeping forces.

In September 2000, Army Lynxes were used in Sierra Leone to rescue several British soldiers during Operation Barras. In 2002, a Lynx attached to  crashed 200 miles off the coast of Virginia.

In March 2003, the Lynx formed the bulk of the deployed British rotary aviation battle group in the invasion of Iraq. Participating aircraft were quickly outfitted with engine sand filters, armour, heat dissipaters, modern secure radios and radar warning receivers. In the subsequent multi-national occupation force, a flight of either AAC or CHF Lynx AH.7s were based at Basra International Airport under command of the Joint Helicopter Force (Iraq) on a rotational basis. In theatre, they would escort infantry patrols, perform aerial reconnaissance, provide fire support and act as airborne communications hubs. Problems in operating in the high temperature environment were encountered, with the helicopters often operating with no power reserve and thus without the ability to overshoot during landings; these problems were belatedly overcome by the introduction of the Lynx AH.9A.

On 6 May 2006, Lynx AH.7 XZ6140 of the CHF, was shot down by a man-portable surface-to-air missile over Basra, southern Iraq; the first British helicopter and only the second British aircraft downed (the first was an RAF Hercules) by enemy fire in the war. Among the five killed were 847 Naval Air Squadron's commanding officer, Lieutenant Commander Darren Chapman; Wing Commander Coxen, who had been due to take command of the region's British helicopter forces, and Flight Lieutenant Sarah-Jayne Mulvihill; Coxen was the most senior British officer to die in the conflict and Mulvihill was the first British servicewoman to die in action in 22 years. At the crash scene, British troops reportedly encountered rioting Iraqi civilians and were fired on by militia, while civilians were killed in the ensuing clashes. The crash led to a review of the vulnerability of helicopter transports in southern Iraq.

In 2006, the first Lynx AH.7 was deployed to Helmand Province, Afghanistan; this variant would only be subsequently used during winter months due to the performance limitations imposed during the high summer temperatures. The Lynx AH.9A later deployed was praised as having been a substantial performance improvement. On 26 April 2014, Lynx AH.9A ZF540 of the Army Air Corps crashed near Kandahar Airfield in Afghanistan, killing the three crew and two passengers on board. This was the first fatal accident in the conflict involving a British military helicopter and the third largest loss of life of British troops in a single incident in Afghanistan since 2001.

The Royal Navy retired its Lynx helicopters from active service on 23 March 2017 with its official decommissioning.  On 17 March, a final flypast was conducted by four Royal Navy Westland Lynx HMA8 helicopters from 815 Naval Air Squadron, based at RNAS Yeovilton in Somerset. The Army Air Corps retired the Lynx in 2018, with the disbandment of 657 Squadron AAC.

Germany

The first German Navy Lynx, a Sea Lynx Mk88 model, was manufactured in 1981. A total of 19 were built. In 1996, the German Navy elected to purchase seven additional Super Lynx Mk88As; in 1998, the decision was taken to upgrade the existing Mk88 fleet, by then numbering a total of 17, to the improved Mk88A standard. In the anti-surface role, Germany's Lynx fleet were supplemented by several Westland Sea Kings, which were upgraded with Sea Skua missiles in the 1990s. In 2009, Germany was studying a limited upgrade programme for their Super Lynx fleet which reportedly included the replacement of the current anti-ship missile. In 2013, the German defence ministry signed a contract with Selex ES to integrate new electro-optical/infrared sensors onto the Super Lynx.

Since 2012, German Lynx have been deployed routinely off the coast of Somalia to discourage and intervene against acts of piracy as a part of the multinational Operation Atalanta. In September 2014, 15 of the navy's 22-strong Sea Lynx Mk88A fleet were temporarily grounded following the discovery of fuselage cracks on some aircraft. The German Defense Ministry estimated that the Sea Lynx fleet will return to full strength in early 2015. In the long term, the German Navy is to retire the Super Lynx in favour of the NH90 Sea Tiger.

South Korea
The Republic of Korea Navy (ROKN) of South Korea took delivery of the first batch of 12 Mk.99 Lynx helicopters in 1990; a second batch of 13 Mk.99A Super Lynx helicopters began delivery in 1999. The first Lynx batch was later upgraded to the same standard as the second batch; the changes included the adoption of a new radar, FLIR, and ESM systems. In 2013, South Korea's Defense Acquisition Program Administration announced its selection of the AW159 Wildcat; deliveries of eight aircraft are planned for 2015–16; these will be used for search and rescue, anti-submarine warfare and surveillance missions.

In May 2009, a ROKN Lynx successfully protected a North Korean freighter from being pursued by pirates off the coast of Somalia. In 2010, South Korea's Lynx fleet was temporarily grounded for emergency inspections following the crashes of two aircraft within the same week. Shortly afterwards it was discovered that the ROKN's helicopters had been victim of a maintenance scam, involving falsified documentation and faked replacement of components; by 2011, 12 employees of two South Korean private companies had been jailed, two ROKN officers were indicted, and several other officers were to be remanded as a result.

Others

In 1979, the Lynx Mk.2(FN) entered service with the French Naval Aviation of the French Navy, a total of 26 aircraft would be procured, followed by 14 improved Mk.4(FN)s. Upon entering service, the French Lynx was more capable of performing independent anti-submarine operations than its Royal Navy counterpart, a single aircraft being capable of simultaneously being equipped for detection and weapon delivery roles. In February 2011, a French Lynx landed on the flight deck of a FREMM multipurpose frigate for the first time as a part of qualifying trials. In addition to France's own Lynx fleet, French Navy vessels have also hosted British Lynx helicopters, such as during an extended counter-piracy deployment on board the   during 2012. In 2019, the French Navy announced plans to retire the Lynx by 2020, and the type carried out its final operational deployment, aboard the frigate , in July 2020. It was formally retired from French service on 4 September 2020.

The Royal Netherlands Navy's (RNN) Naval Aviation Service operated fleet of 24 Lynx for a total of 36 years, entering service in 1976 and phased out in 2012 after being extensively used. These performed search and rescue, anti-submarine warfare, anti-surface warfare and special forces support tasks while operating from the flight decks of most RNN vessels during this period. In 1993, the RNN fleet were upgraded to a common Lynx SH-14D standard. In 1999, a design defect in the rotor-head used on some Lynx aircraft was responsible for the loss of a Dutch aircraft in 1999; this led to a number of Lynx worldwide to be temporarily grounded until retrofitted with new titanium rotor-heads. On 28 February 2011, a Dutch Lynx and three navy personnel were captured by Libyan forces while performing an evacuation mission inside the country. On 19 September 2012, the RNN performed its final operational Lynx flight.

The Portuguese Naval Aviation of the Portuguese Navy exclusively operates the Super Lynx Mk.95. In 1990, Portugal signed a contract for a total of five Super Lynx, two of them being refurbished ex-Royal Navy aircraft. A total of two Lynx can be operated from the flight deck of a single ; they typically accompany the vessels, including during long distance deployments for anti-piracy operations off the Horn of Africa.

In 1978, the Brazilian Navy became the first foreign operator of the Lynx helicopter, having taken delivery of its first of a batch of five that year. During the 1990s, the fleet was more than doubled by the acquisition of a further batch of nine. During overseas deployments for multinational training exercises and United Nations operations, the Lynx has been described as "eyes and the ears of the fleet". In 2009, Brazil deployed several Lynx in an effort to locate the missing Air France Flight 447. In 2014, a mid-life upgrade process was agreed for Brazil's Lynx fleet, they shall receive LHTEC CTS800-4N engines, new avionics, satellite navigation systems, countermeasures, and night vision-compatible cockpit displays.

The Royal Norwegian Air Force (RNoAF) received its six Lynx Mk 86 in 1981. 337 Squadron was reactivated at Bardufoss and declared operational with Lynx in 1983. RNoAF operates the aircraft with the Norwegian Coast Guard's s. In 2010, one Lynx reached the end of its operational life and was withdrawn from service; a second aircraft suffered a non-fatal crash in 1988 and was totally rebuilt by Westland. The Lynx was to have been progressively replaced by the NH90 from 2005 onwards; however, deliveries of the new type suffered multiple delays, leading to Norway considering life extension measures on some of their Lynx fleet. Lynx was decommissioned in December 2014.

The Royal Danish Navy (RDN) took delivery of eight Lynx Mk 80 between 1980 and 1981. A further two Mk 90 were delivered in 1987 and 1988 as attrition replacements. Operated by the Danish Naval Air Squadron, the RDN fleet is typically stationed upon naval inspection vessels and used to patrol Greenland and Faroe Islands as well as the Danish mainland. Beginning in 2000, the whole Lynx fleet was upgraded to Mk 90B standard. In January 2011, control of the Lynx fleet was transferred from the Danish Navy to the Royal Danish Air Force.

Variants

Land-based variants
Westland WG.13
Prototype, first flight 21 March 1971. Thirteen prototypes built.
Lynx AH.1
Initial production version for the British Army Air Corps, powered by 671 kW (900 hp) Gem 2 engines, with first production example flying 11 February 1977, and deliveries continuing until February 1984, with 113 built. Used for a variety of tasks, including tactical transport, armed escort, anti-tank warfare (60 were equipped with eight TOW missiles as Lynx AH.1 (TOW) from 1981), reconnaissance and casualty evacuation.
Lynx AH.1GT
Interim conversion of the AH.1 to partial AH.7 standard for the Army Air Corps with uprated engines and revised tail rotor.
Lynx HT.1
Planned training version for Royal Air Force to replace the Westland Whirlwind, cancelled.
Lynx AH.5
Upgraded version for the Army Air Corps, with 835 kW (1,120 shp) Gem 41-1 engines and uprated gearbox. Three built as AH.5 (Interim) as trials aircraft for MoD. Eight ordered as AH.5s for the Army Air Corps, of which only two were built as AH.5s, the remaining six were completed as AH.7s. Four were later upgraded to AH.7 standard and one was retained for trials work as an AH.5X.
Lynx AH.6
Proposed version for the Royal Marines with undercarriage, folding tail and deck lock of Naval Lynx. Not built.

Lynx AH.7
Further upgraded version for the Army Air Corps, with Gem 41-1 engines and uprated gearbox of the AH.5 and new, larger, composite material tail rotor. Later refitted with BERP type rotor blades. Twelve new builds and 107 Lynx AH.1s converted. A small number also used by the Fleet Air Arm in support of the Royal Marines. The Lynx AH.7 can also be outfitted for the anti-armour role, with the attachment of two pylons, each carrying four TOW anti-tank guided missiles. In the light-lift role, it can carry an aircrew member armed with a cabin door mounted L7 General Purpose Machine Gun (GPMG), as well as troops for fast-rope or abseiling insertions, or regular landings. It can also transport cargo. Now replaced in the attack role by the AgustaWestland Apache attack helicopter.
Lynx AH.7(DAS)
AH.7 with Defensive Aids Subsystem.
Lynx AH.9 ("Battlefield Lynx")
Utility version for Army Air Corps, based on AH.7, but with wheeled undercarriage and further upgraded gearbox. Sixteen new-built plus eight converted from AH.7s.

Lynx AH.9A
AH.9 with more powerful LHTEC CTS800-4N 1,015 kW (1,362 shp) engines, which allowed the door-mounted GPMG of the AH.7 to be replaced with a .50-inch (12.7 mm) heavy machine gun (HMG) as well as flight in hotter conditions. All 22 AH.9 were upgraded. A small number also used by the Fleet Air Arm in support of the Royal Marines.

Naval variants
Lynx HAS.2 / Mk.2(FN)
Initial production version for the Royal Navy (HAS.2) and the French Navy (Mk.2(FN)), powered by Gem 2 engines and with wheeled undercarriage, folding rotors and tail and deck lock. HAS.2 equipped with British Sea Spray radar, with Mk.2(FN) having French radar and dipping sonar. When it used in the anti-submarine role, it can carry two torpedoes or depth charges. For anti-surface warfare, it is equipped with either four Sea Skua missiles (Royal Navy) or four AS.12 missiles (French Navy). 60 built for Royal Navy, and 26 for France.
Lynx HAS.2.5
An interim HAS 3 equipped with the improved Gem 42 series engines but the original HAS 2 gearbox. Only used by 702 NAS in 1985/86 before all were converted to full HAS 3 standard.

Lynx HAS.3
Improved version of HAS.2 powered by Gem 42-1 engines and with upgraded gearbox. Thirty built from new, with deliveries starting in March 1982 and all remaining HAS.2s (53 aircraft) converted to HAS.3 standards.
Lynx HAS.3GM
Modified HAS.3 helicopters for the Royal Navy, for service in the Persian Gulf, with improved electronic warfare equipment, revised IFF and provision for Forward looking infrared (FLIR) under fuselage. Originally deployed for the 1990–91 Gulf War. Designated HAS.3S/GM when fitted with secure radios. (GM denotes Gulf Modification).
Lynx HAS.3S
Improved version of the HAS.3 for the Royal Navy fitted with secure radio systems.
Lynx HAS.3SGM
An improved HAS.3GM with integrated Secure V/UHF communications, Mode 4 IFF, Loral Challenger ALQ 157 Infra Red Countermeasures turrets (fitted on the fuselage side high up just behind the Plot's/Observer's doors), M130 Chaff/Flare dispensers and provision for Sandpiper Forward looking infrared (FLIR) mounted under the port side inboard weapon carrier. First aircraft converted was XZ733, which deployed with the Type 22 frigate HMS Brave in January 1991 for Operation Granby (Gulf War).

Lynx HAS.3ICE
HAS.3 modified for Antarctic service aboard ice patrol ships . Designated HAS.3SICE when fitted with secure radios.
Lynx HAS.3CTS
HAS.3 upgraded with avionics system proposed for HMA.8. Seven converted as test beds.
Lynx Mk.4(FN)
Upgraded version for the Aéronavale, with Gem 42-1 engines. Fourteen built.
Lynx HMA.8Upgraded maritime attack version based on Super Lynx 100. Gem 42-200 engines, BERP type main rotors and larger tail rotor of AH.7. Fitted with FLIR in turret above nose, with radar moved to radome below nose.
Lynx HMA.8(DSP)
DSP from digital signal processor.
Lynx HMA.8(DAS)
DSP aircraft were modified with "Defensive Aids Subsystem".
Lynx HMA.8(SRU)
DAS aircraft modified with SATURN ("Second-generation Anti-jam Tactical UHF Radio for NATO") Radio Upgrade. Incorporates SIFF ("Successor to IFF").
Lynx HMA.8(CMP)
Combined Mods Programme. SRU aircraft modified with improved communications and defensive systems.

With all HMA.8 aircraft upgraded to CMP standard, HMA.8(CMP) aircraft were re-designated back to HMA.8(SRU). The Lynx HAS.8 fleet is currently undergoing further modifications, by the Lynx Operational Support Team, to improve self-defence, mission execution and survivability. These modifications will not affect the SRU designation.

Export variants

Lynx Mk.21
Export version of the HAS.2 for the Brazilian Navy. Brazilian navy designation SAH-11. Nine delivered.
Super Lynx Mk.21A
Version of the Super Lynx (based on HAS.8) for the Brazilian navy, with Gem 42 engines and 360° traverse Seaspray 3000 radar under nose. Nine new build helicopters plus upgrades of remaining five original Mk.21s.
Super Lynx Mk.21B
Upgrade of Mk.21A for Brazilian Navy, with CTS800 engines and updated avionics. Brazilian designation AH-11B. Eight to be upgraded.
Lynx Mk.22
Unbuilt export version for the Egyptian Navy.
Lynx Mk.23
Export version of the HAS.2 for the Argentine Navy. Two built. Grounded due to British embargo on spares following Falklands War. Single surviving helicopter later sold to Denmark. The two Lynx 23s took part in the Argentine invasion and occupation of the Falkland Island in March 1982 as part of Task Force 40; one was lost in an accident on Santisma Trinidad on 2 May 1982.
Lynx Mk.24
Unbuilt export utility version for the Iraqi army.

Lynx Mk.25
Export version of the HAS.2 for the Royal Netherlands Navy. Designated UH-14A in Dutch service. Used for utility and SAR roles. Six built.
Lynx Mk.26
Unbuilt export armed version for the Iraqi army.
Lynx Mk.27
Export version for the Royal Netherlands Navy with 836 kW (1,120 kW) Gem 4 engines. Equipped for ASW missions with dipping sonar. Designated SH-14B in Dutch service. 10 built.
Lynx Mk.28
Export version of the AH.1 for the Qatar Police. Three built.
Lynx Mk.64
Export version of the Super Lynx for the South African Air Force.

Lynx Mk.80
Export version for the Royal Danish Navy based on the HAS.3 with folding tail. Eight built.
Lynx Mk.81
Upgraded ASW version for the Royal Netherlands Navy, powered by Gem 41 engines with no sonar but fitted with towed Magnetic anomaly detector. Designated SH-14C in Dutch service, and mainly used for training and utility purposes. Eight built.
SH-14D
UH-14A/SH-14B/SH-14C Lynx upgraded to a common standard by the Royal Netherlands Navy under the STAMOL programme with Gem 42 engines, provision for dipping sonar and FLIR. 22 upgraded.
Lynx Mk.82
Unbuilt export version for the Egyptian army.
Lynx Mk.83
Unbuilt export version for the Saudi Arabian army.
Lynx Mk 84
Unbuilt export version for the Qatar army.
Lynx Mk 85
Unbuilt export version for the United Arab Emirates army.
Lynx Mk.86
Export SAR version of the HAS.2 for the Royal Norwegian Air Force.
Lynx Mk.87
Embargoed export version for the Argentine navy. Two completed and sold to Denmark as Mk.90
Lynx Mk.88
Export version for the German Navy with Gem 42 engines, and dipping sonar. Nineteen built.
Super Lynx Mk.88A
Upgraded export version for the German Navy with Gem 42 engines, under-nose radome with 360° traverse radar and FLIR above nose. Seven new build helicopters plus conversion of 17 Mk.88s.
Lynx Mk.89
Export version of HAS.3 for the Nigerian navy. Three built.
Lynx Mk.90
Export version for the Royal Danish Navy, modified from embargoed Argentine Mk.87s. Lynx Mk.90A is the upgraded version. The Lynx Mk.90 and Mk.90A were upgraded to Super Lynx standard and designated Mk.90B.
Lynx Mk.95
Version of Super Lynx for the Portuguese Navy, with Bendix radar in undernose radome, dipping sonar but no FLIR. Three new build plus two converted ex-Royal Navy HAS.3s. Being upgraded with CTS 800 engines and new avionics.

Super Lynx Mk.99
Version of Super Lynx for the South Korean Navy, with Seaspray 3 radar in undernose radome, dipping sonar, and FLIR, for anti-submarine and anti-ship operations. Twelve were built. Super Lynx Mk.99A is the upgraded version with improved rotor, with a further 13 built.
Super Lynx Mk.100
Super Lynx for the Royal Malaysian Navy, with 990 kW (1,327 hp) CTS-800-4N engines. Six built.

Super Lynx Mk.110
Super Lynx 300 for Thai Navy. Four ordered.
Super Lynx Mk.120
Export version for the Royal Air Force of Oman. 16 built.
Super Lynx Mk.130
Export version for the Algerian Navy. Four ordered.
Super Lynx 300
Advanced Super Lynx with CTS-800-4N engines.

Projects
Lynx HT.3
Proposed training version for the Royal Air Force, not built.
Lynx 3
Enhanced Lynx variant with Westland 30 tail boom and rotor, Gem 60 engines, new wheeled tricycle undercarriage and MIL-STD-1553 databus. Only one prototype built (serial/registration ZE477 / G-17-24) in 1984.
Battlefield Lynx
Proposed export version of Lynx AH.9.
Battlefield Lynx 800
Proposed export version of Lynx AH.9 with LHTEC T800 engines, the project was suspended in 1992. One demonstrator helicopter was built and flight tested.
Lynx ACH
Proposed Advanced Compound Helicopter technology demonstrator, partly funded by the Ministry of Defence. Announced in May 1998, the ACH was planned to be powered by RTM322 engines with variable area exhaust nozzles and a gearbox from the Westland 30-200; they have wings attached at cabin roof level and BERP rotor blades. It was predicted to fly approximately 50% faster than a standard Lynx.
Westland 606
Proposed civilian variant.
Westland 606-10 proposed civil variant powered by Pratt & Whitney PT6-34B engines.
Westland 606-20 proposed civil variant powered by Gem engines.

Notes: AH=Army Helicopter, HAS=Helicopter, Anti-Submarine, HMA=Helicopter, Maritime Attack, IFF=Identification Friend or Foe, (GM)=Gulf Modification, (S)=Secure speech radio, and SIFF=Successor to IFF.

Derivatives
Westland 30
 Medium helicopter based on the Lynx, using some dynamic systems with a new, enlarged fuselage for up to 22 passengers.
AgustaWestland AW159 Wildcat
 Further development of the Super Lynx with two LHTEC CTS800 engines; previously known as the Future Lynx.

Operators

Algerian Navy

Brazilian Navy

German Navy

Royal Malaysian Navy

Royal Air Force of Oman

Portuguese Navy

South African Air Force

Republic of Korea Navy

Royal Thai Navy

Former operators

Argentine Navy

Royal Danish Navy/Royal Danish Air Force

French Navy Retired 2020.

Royal Netherlands Navy

Nigerian Navy

Royal Norwegian Air Force

Pakistan Navy

 Qatar Police

 Royal Navy
 British Army

Aircraft on display
 G-LYNX, Westland's former demonstrator, is preserved at The Helicopter Museum, Weston-super-Mare
 ZE477, the Lynx-3 prototype, is on display at The Helicopter Museum, Weston-super-Mare
 XZ720 is preserved at the Fleet Air Arm Museum, Yeovilton
 XZ194, a Lynx AH.7, is on display at Imperial War Museum Duxford
XZ185, a Lynx AH.7, is on display at the Pima Air & Space Museum, Arizona
XZ246, a Lynx HAS.3ICE, is on display at the South Yorkshire Aircraft Museum, Doncaster
239-UA,a Lynx AH.7 Airframe, is used as a game zone prop at Driver Wood Activity Centre, Copthorne, West Sussex

Specifications (Super Lynx Series 100)

See also

References

Notes

Citations

Bibliography

 
 Donald, David and Christopher Chant. Air War in the Gulf 1991. Osprey Publishing, 2001. .
 Eden, Paul, ed. "Westland Lynx".Encyclopedia of Modern Military Aircraft. Amber Books, 2004. .
 English, Richard and Oppenheimer, A. R. IRA, the Bombs and the Bullets: a History of Deadly Ingenuity. Irish Academic Press, 2009. .
 Ethell, Jeffrey and Price, Alfred. Air War South Atlantic. London:Sidgwick and Jackson, 1983. .
 Finlan, Alastair. The Gulf War 1991. Osprey Publishing, 2003. .
 Gibbings, David. Putting the Record Straight. Picton Publishing, 1988. .
 Gibbings, David. "The Evolution of the British Rotorcraft Industry." The Journal of Aeronautical History, September 2009. No. 2012/07. pp. 112–146.
 Gray, Peter. "New Life For Lynx". Flight International, 16–22 July 2002. pp. 84–90.
 Harnden, Toby. Bandit Country: The IRA and South Armagh. Hodder & Stoughton, 2000. .
 James, Derek N. Westland Aircraft since 1915. London: Putnam, 1991, .
 Jackson, Paul. Jane's All The World's Aircraft 2003–2004. Coulsdon, UK, 2003. .
 Lake, Jon. "Westland Sea King: Variant Briefing". World Airpower Journal, Volume 25, Summer 1996, pp. 110–135. London: Aerospace Publishing. . .
 Lake, Jon. "Westland Lynx Variant Briefing:Part 1". World Air Power Journal, Volume 39, Winter 1999. London: Aerospace Publishing. . . pp. 126–141.
 Lake, Jon. "Westland Lynx Variant Briefing:Part 2". World Air Power Journal, Volume 40, Spring 2000. London: Aerospace Publishing. . . pp. 112–121.
 Matos, Jose. "Unleash the Lynx". Air International, Volume 99, No. 6, December 2020. . pp. 82–87.
 Penny, Stewart. "Fitter Feline." Flight International, 16–22 July 2002. pp. 92–95.
 Prouty, Ray. "Helicopter Aerodynamics Volume II". Eagle Eye Solutions, 2009. .
 Ra'anan, Uri., Pfaltzgraff, Robert L. and Kemp, Geoffrey. Arms Transfers to the Third World: The Military Buildup in Less Industrial Countries. Westview Press, 1978. .
 Riply, Tim. British Army Aviation in Action. Casemate Publishers, 2011. .
 Ṣāyigh, Yazīd. Arab Military Industry: Capability, Performance, and Impact. Brassey's, 1992. .
 Sloot, Emiel & Hornstra, Luc. "AgustaWestland Lynx and Super Lynx". International Air Power Review, Volume 26, 2009, pp. 74–95. Westport, Connecticut: AirTime Publishing. .
 "T800-engined Lynx set for Paris debut". Flight International, 30 January – 5 February 1991. p. 16.
 "T800 Lynx Programme Stalls". Flight International, 11–17 March 1992, p. 18.
 "Directory: World Air Forces". Flight International, 11–17 November 2008, pp. 52–76.

External links

 The Westland Scout, Wasp, & Lynx page on vectorsite.net
 Westland Lynx section on helis.com
 Fédération Aéronautique Internationale (FAI) rotorcraft world records page
 "Westland-Aerospatiale Lynx" a 1974 Flight article

1970s British military utility aircraft
1970s British attack aircraft
1970s British anti-submarine aircraft
Military helicopters
1970s British helicopters
Search and rescue helicopters
Lynx
Twin-turbine helicopters
Aircraft first flown in 1971
Anti-submarine helicopters